Andreia Aparecida Hessel (born 10 August 1984) is a Brazilian long-distance runner. In 2019, she competed in the women's marathon at the 2019 World Athletics Championships held in Doha, Qatar. She finished in 36th place.

In 2018, she won the São Paulo Marathon held in São Paulo, Brazil.

In 2019, she competed in the women's marathon at the 2019 Pan American Games held in Lima, Peru. She finished in 8th place.

References

External links 
 

Living people
1984 births
Place of birth missing (living people)
Brazilian female long-distance runners
Brazilian female marathon runners
World Athletics Championships athletes for Brazil
Pan American Games athletes for Brazil
Athletes (track and field) at the 2019 Pan American Games
21st-century Brazilian women